Taub is a surname. It may refer to:

Persons 
 Abraham H. Taub (1911–1999), American mathematician and physicist
 Ari Taub (wrestler) (born 1971), Canadian Greco-Roman wrestler
 Ben Taub (1889–1982), American philanthropist and medical benefactor
 Daniel Taub (born 1962), Israeli Ambassador To The Court Of St James
 David Rosenmann-Taub (born 1927), Chilean poet, musician, and artist
 Edward Taub (born 1931), American behavioral neuroscientist
 Gadi Taub (born 1965), Israeli historian, author, screenwriter, and political commentator
 Gypsy Taub
 Henry Taub (1927–2011), American businessman and philanthropist
 Richard Taub (born 1937), American sociologist
 Robert Taub (born 1955), American concert pianist

Fictional characters 
 Chris Taub, fictional character on the Fox medical drama House

See also
 Taub., taxonomic author abbreviation of Paul Hermann Wilhelm Taubert (1862–1897), German botanist
 Daub (surname)
 Taube (surname)
 Taubes (surname)

German-language surnames
Jewish surnames
Surnames from nicknames